The Big Wet may refer to:

 The Big Wet, informal name for floods in Australia
 The Big Wet (comics), a fictional worldwide disaster in the comic book Wasteland